Altos de Lircay National Reserve is a  nature reserve located in Talca Province, Maule Region, Chile. It lies in a pre-Andean area close to Radal Siete Tazas National Park, as well as Descabezado Grande and Cerro Azul volcanoes.

The reserve is home to a significant variety of wildlife including rare and threatened animals such as the Tricahue parrot, Molina's hog-nosed skunk and plants such as the ciprés de la cordillera and roble Maulino. In the area can be found seven of the ten species of the genus Nothofagus occurring in Chile.

There are three major rivers in the reserve, the Lircay that is a tributary of the Claro River, the Claro that flows north to south through the reserve, and the Blanquillo that joins the latter river in the reserve.

References

 Supreme Decree 59, 1996, Ministry of Agriculture of Chile

National reserves of Chile
Protected areas of Maule Region